Mulifanua is a village on the north-western tip of the island of Upolu, in Samoa. In the modern era, it is the capital of Aiga-i-le-Tai district. Mulifanua wharf is  the main ferry terminal for inter-island vehicle and passenger travel across the Apolima Strait between Upolu and the island of Savai'i.

Ferry terminal

The ferry terminal at Mulifanua wharf is five minutes west of Faleolo International Airport. The government's Samoa Shipping Corporation operates the ferry service, seven days a week, between Mulifanua and Salelologa at the east end of Savai'i island. A one-way trip between the two islands takes about 90 minutes. The ferry  usually runs every two hours during the day. There are several small shops selling snacks, and there are always buses and taxis available at the terminal for departures and arrivals.

Archaeology

In 1973, archaeology in Samoa uncovered a Lapita site at Mulifanua where 4,288 pottery sherds and two Lapita type adzes have been recovered. The site has a true age of circa 3,000 BP based on C14 dating on a shell. This is the only site in Samoa where decorated Lapita sherds have been found, although pieces of Polynesian plainware ceramics are commonly found throughout the Samoan islands. The submerged site was discovered during work carried out to expand the inter-island ferry berth at Mulifanua.

2007 South Pacific Games
Aggie Grey’s Resort and Spa at Mulifanua and Faleolo was the venue for the sailing and va'a (outrigger canoeing) events at the 2007 South Pacific Games.

References

External links
 Mulifanua at the official site to the 2007 Pacific Games

Populated places in Aiga-i-le-Tai
Underwater ruins
Archaeological sites in Samoa
Populated places established in the 10th century BC